Andreas Müller may refer to:
 Andreas Müller (footballer, born 1962), German footballer
 Andreas Müller (footballer, born 2000), German footballer
 Andreas Müller (painter) (1811–1890), German historical painter
 Andreas Müller (athlete) (born 1971), Paralympic athlete from Germany
 Andreas Müller (cyclist) (born 1979), Austrian track cyclist

See also 
 Andreas Möller (born 1967), German footballer
 Joachim Daniel Andreas Müller (1812–1857), Swedish gardener and writer
 Walter Andreas Müller (born 1945), Swiss actor